Quisling Towers Apartments, in Madison, Wisconsin, was built in 1937. It was added to the National Register of Historic Places in 1984.

History
The building was constructed for Dr. Abraham Quisling, who commissioned Lawrence Monberg, then a young architect, to design the building. In 1993, it was designated a landmark by the Madison Landmarks Commission.

References

Residential buildings on the National Register of Historic Places in Wisconsin
Apartment buildings in Wisconsin
Buildings and structures in Madison, Wisconsin
Streamline Moderne architecture in Wisconsin
Residential buildings completed in 1937
National Register of Historic Places in Madison, Wisconsin